Dieter Ficken (born June 14, 1944) was a German-American soccer forward and coach who spent his club career in the U.S. third division German American Soccer League. He earned one cap with the U.S. national team. He coached collegiate soccer from 1974 to 2008.

Player

Youth
Born in Bremen, Germany, Ficken grew up in Park Slope neighborhood of Brooklyn, New York. His family had traveled to the U.S. when he was nine for a visit, but ended up staying in the U.S. where he lived with an aunt Ficken graduated from John Jay High School then attended Long Island University where he played on the men’s soccer team from 1962 to 1965. He graduated in 1966 with a bachelor's degree in business management. He returned to LIU to gain a master’s degree in finance in 1970. Following graduation, Ficken worked as an investment banker and in real estate before turning to coaching 1974.

Club
Ficken played for S.C. Eintracht of the German American Soccer League from 1970 until 1974.

National team
Ficken played for the U.S. team at the 1967 Pan American Games. The U.S. went 1–2 in the group stage and did not qualify for the second round. Ficken earned one cap with the U.S. national team in a 2–1 World Cup qualification loss to Mexico on September 10, 1972 in Los Angeles.

Coach
In 1974, Ficken entered the coaching ranks as an assistant with Long Island University. He became head coach of LIU in 1976. Before leaving the school in 1979, he led the team to a 39–9–7 record. Columbia University hired Ficken as its men’s soccer coach in 1979. During his twenty-seven seasons, he led the team to a 252–139–53 record and the 1983 NCAA championship game where it lost to the University of Indiana. That year, he was named the NCAA Coach of the Year. He announced his retirement from Columbia on January 13, 2006. On March 6, 2007, Ficken returned to Long Island University to become the men’s soccer coach. Now Ficken coaches the u16 New York Cosmos East academy club

External links
 Profile of Ficken’s coaching career

References

Living people
1944 births
People from Park Slope
German emigrants to the United States
Sportspeople from Brooklyn
Soccer players from New York City
American soccer players
Footballers from Bremen
Association football forwards
United States men's international soccer players
Pan American Games competitors for the United States
Footballers at the 1967 Pan American Games
German-American Soccer League players
LIU Sharks men's soccer players
American soccer coaches
Columbia Lions men's soccer coaches
LIU Sharks men's soccer coaches